Kattumannarkoil block is a revenue block of Cuddalore district of the Indian state of Tamil Nadu. This revenue block consist of 55 panchayat villages.Total area of Kattumannarkoil is 455 km2 including 406.38 km2 rural area and 48.74 km2 urban area.Kattumannarkoil has a population of 2,76,947 peoples. There are 67,752 houses in the sub-district. There are about 147 villages in Kattumannarkoil block .

References 
LALPET(LALGAANPET)

Revenue blocks of Cuddalore district